Al-Shorta Stadium was a multi-use stadium in Baghdad, Iraq. It was used mostly for football matches, serving as the home stadium of Al-Shorta SC, and was able to hold 8,634 people. The stadium was known as "The Cage" by Al-Shorta fans.

Abdul-Qadir Zeinal, club president at the time, oversaw the construction of the stadium in the late 1980s with club workers and volunteers and it was opened for its first match on 23 December 1990 where Al-Shorta beat Al-Tijara 3–2.

The stadium began to be demolished on 4 March 2014 to make way for the construction of Al-Shorta Sports City, a sports complex for the club including a new all-seater stadium.

References

External links
Venue information

Al-Shorta SC
Football venues in Iraq
Sport in Baghdad
Sports venues completed in 1990
1990 establishments in Iraq
Sports venues demolished in 2014
2014 disestablishments in Iraq
Defunct sports venues in Iraq
Demolished buildings and structures in Iraq
Demolished sports venues